Alonzo A. Crim Open Campus High School (COCHS) is a public high school in Atlanta, Georgia, United States. It is located at 256 Clifton Street SE. It replaced Alonzo A. Crim Comprehensive High School after it closed in 2005. Part of Atlanta Public Schools, it is located in southeast Atlanta, in the Kirkwood neighborhood.

The school is inside DeKalb County.

History
Until 1988, the school was named Murphy High School.  From 1988 to 2005, the school was named Alonzo Aristotle Crim Comprehensive High School. Its feeder schools were Sammye E. Coan Middle School and Thurgood Marshall Middle School.

Former athletic programs
The Eagles athletic teams competed in Region 2-AA of the Georgia High School Association.

In its last year as a traditional school, Crim High School's athletic program offered varsity girls' softball, varsity boys' track, varsity football, varsity boys' basketball, junior varsity boys' basketball, varsity girls' basketball, junior varsity girls' basketball, varsity basketball, junior varsity basketball, and cheerleading.

Notable alumni (traditional school)

References

External links
 Crim High School

Atlanta Public Schools high schools
Public high schools in DeKalb County, Georgia
Educational institutions established in 2005
2005 establishments in Georgia (U.S. state)